In the Closet of the Vatican: Power, Homosexuality, Hypocrisy  is a book by Frédéric Martel, which was published in French by Éditions Robert Laffont in February 2019 as well as being simultaneously released in eight languages.  The book is based upon the concordant testimonies from 41 cardinals, 52 bishops and 45 apostolic nuncios.  The author argues that an overwhelming majority of priests and bishops serving in the Vatican—including several prelates who have given anti-gay-sex speeches—are gay, and either secretly have sex with men or repress their desires.

The book is not primarily about child sexual abuse by priests but instead investigates the everyday dishonesty of Catholic priests who lie about their sexual orientation.

See also 
 Krzysztof Charamsa
 Priest (1994 film)

References 

Gay non-fiction books
2010s LGBT literature
LGBT literature in France
Works about LGBT and Catholicism
Éditions Robert Laffont books
2019 non-fiction books
Roman Catholic Clergy sexuality